The 2019–20 season was SC Paderborn's 35th season in existence and the club's 1st season back in the top flight of German football. In addition to the domestic league, SC Paderborn participated in this season's edition of the DFB-Pokal. The season covered the period from 1 July 2019 to 30 June 2020.

Players

Current squad

Players out of team

Players out on loan

Pre-season and friendlies

Competitions

Overview

Bundesliga

League table

Results summary

Results by round

Matches
The Bundesliga schedule was announced on 28 June 2019.

DFB-Pokal

References

External links

SC Paderborn 07 seasons
SC Freiburg